Arisaema stewardsonii is a species of flowering plant in the arum family Araceae. It is a member of the Arisaema triphyllum complex, a group of closely-related taxa in eastern North America. The specific name stewardsonii honors American botanist Stewardson Brown (1867–1921). It is commonly known as the bog Jack-in-the-pulpit (or bog Jack). It is sometimes referred to as the swamp Jack-in-the-pulpit, not to be confused with Arisaema pusillum, which is also known by that name.

Description
Arisaema stewardsonii is a herbaceous, perennial, flowering plant growing from a corm. Like other members of the Arisaema triphyllum complex, it has three leaflets per leaf. Its spathe tube is strongly fluted (ridged), the only member of the complex with this distinctive character.

Taxonomy
Arisaema stewardsonii was first described and named by Nathaniel Lord Britton in 1901. Earlier that year, its type specimen was collected in Tannersville, Pennsylvania by Stewardson Brown, Eugene Pintard Bicknell, and Britton. The author referred to the type as Stewardson Brown's Indian turnip.

Arisaema stewardsonii is a member of the Arisaema triphyllum complex, a group of closely-related taxa that also includes Arisaema acuminatum, Arisaema pusillum, Arisaema quinatum, and Arisaema triphyllum. , some authorities consider Arisaema stewardsonii to be a synonym for Arisaema triphyllum or A. triphyllum subsp. stewardsonii. However, most authorities accept Arisaema stewardsonii and the other species-level members of the complex.

Distribution and habitat
Arisaema stewardsonii was originally found in eastern Pennsylvania growing in wet woods among Sphagnum mosses, hence the name bog Jack-in-the-pulpit. It occurs primarily in the northeastern United States and the Maritime provinces of eastern Canada, ranging southward to the mountains in eastern Tennessee and western North Carolina, and westward to Ohio. Being the most northern taxon of the Arisaema triphyllum complex, it is sometimes called the northern Jack-in-the-pulpit.

Conservation
The global conservation status of Arisaema stewardsonii is unknown. Based on the conservation status of Arisaema triphyllum subsp. stewardsonii, it may be inferred that Arisaema stewardsonii is globally secure (G5). It is uncommon (or worse) in North Carolina (S3), Ohio (S3), District of Columbia (S1S3), and New Jersey (S2).

References

Bibliography
 

stewardsonii
Flora of Eastern Canada
Flora of the Northeastern United States
Plants described in 1901
Taxa named by Nathaniel Lord Britton
Flora without expected TNC conservation status